State Route 87 (SR 87), known as the Guadalupe Freeway or referred to by the locals as Highway 87, is a north–south state highway in San Jose, California, United States. Before being upgraded to a freeway, it was Guadalupe Parkway (and some signs still refer to it that way).

For most of its length, especially in Downtown San Jose, the highway follows the course of the Guadalupe River. Its southern terminus is at SR 85, and its northern terminus is at U.S. Route 101 (US 101) just north of San Jose International Airport. Unusually, it crosses over Interstate 880 (I-880) without an interchange.

Route description

The route is almost entirely within the city of San Jose, California.  A very small portion between the Curtner Avenue exit and the Capitol Expressway Auto Mall exit is in unincorporated Santa Clara County. 

SR 87 initially had 2 lanes in each direction for its entire length. Carpool lanes were added north of Taylor Street in 2005 and the remainder of the freeway in 2007.

SR 87 begins at SR 85 in southern San Jose. VTA light-rails run parallel to this freeway from SR 85 to I-280. After intersecting CR G21, SR 87 runs through a small pass in Communications Hill. SR 87 intersects I-280 in southwestern Downtown San Jose, then runs parallel to the western border of Downtown San Jose. SR 87 then runs east of the Mineta San Jose International Airport before terminating at US 101 in northwestern San Jose. This route is unconstructed from US 101 to SR 237 in Santa Clara, legislatively defined to run north from US 101 through suburban San Jose and Santa Clara, terminating at SR 237, as this route is defined as (a) Route 85 in the vicinity of Santa Teresa Boulevard to Route 101 in the vicinity of Guadalupe River and (b) San Jose easterly of Route 101 to Route 237.

SR 87 is part of the California Freeway and Expressway System, and is part of the National Highway System, a network of highways that are considered essential to the country's economy, defense, and mobility by the Federal Highway Administration. In 2014, SR 87 had an annual average daily traffic (AADT) of 88,000 at US 101, and 176,000 between I-280 and CR G8, the latter of which was the highest AADT for the highway.

I-880 Overcrossing
Unusually, SR 87 crosses above I-880 without an interchange. Located between Taylor Street and Skyport Drive, the site where the two freeways cross has two restrictions that prevent the construction of any connecting ramps. First, because of its proximity to the runways at San Jose International Airport, any elevated ramps running above the SR 87 mainline would interfere with flight paths. Second, tunneling underneath would leave a significant environmental impact on the nearby Guadalupe River. Drivers from SR 87 to I-880 and vice versa have to use First Street, Taylor Street, and Coleman Avenue to get on the freeways.

SR 87 Bikeway
The SR 87 Bikeway is a  pedestrian and bicycle path that runs alongside portions of SR 87. The path was constructed by Caltrans as part of the final phase of the SR 87 project. It opened to the public on September 1, 1993.   The north end of this path is at Willow Street (north of the Alma Street exit). The south end is at the 87-85 interchange. Along this route, the path runs along the east side of the freeway. The path diverges from the freeway for  near Curtner Avenue and again for  near Capitol Expressway, running along city streets near the highway. This path provides connections for other trails in the area, including the Guadalupe River Trail and Los Gatos Creek Trail.

History

A Guadalupe Parkway connection between Downtown San Jose and the present day US 101 had existed since the early 1960s; the road channeled traffic between the Bayshore Freeway and ramps that connected directly to Market Street.  However, construction on a freeway over the same path and southward beyond Downtown began a decade later and stretched across 30 years.

The first stage of the SR 87 freeway, its 4-level interchange with I-280, replaced an old downtown neighborhood in the mid 1960s.  A ramp to Julian Street, north of the interchange with I-280, was completed in the mid-1970s.  The freeway extension north to Taylor Street was completed in May 1988. Construction of SR 87 in the 1980s is shown in this photo. The southern part, from I-280 to SR 85, was opened to Almaden Expressway in September-October 1992 and to SR 85 in August 1993, built in conjunction with the construction of a light rail line. Local-express lanes were constructed along this segment, the Northbound segment running from I-280 to Julian Street and the Southbound extension from I-280 to Alma Avenue. At SR 87's northern terminus, its 3-level interchange with Highway 101 and North First Street was completed in 1992. Finally, with all grade-level intersections replaced by grade separations, construction of the six-lane freeway between Taylor Street and the Highway 101/North First interchange began in the late 1990s was completed in 2004, and the name Guadalupe Parkway stopped being used (except on some signs).  The final ramps at the Skyport interchange opened in 2005. The widening of the southern segment, from Taylor Street to Highway 85, to six lanes was completed in 2007. In each direction, two lanes are for regular traffic and one lane is an HOV lane.

The right-of-way for SR 87 south of I-280 includes two tracks for the Guadalupe line of the Santa Clara Valley Transportation Authority light rail system. Stations are accessible from the streets via staircases and elevators.  Beyond 87's terminus, the line continues southeastward in the median of SR 85.

SR 87, as once defined legislatively, would have extended from its current northern terminus, skirting the edge of San Francisco Bay as the Bayfront Freeway to San Francisco. This would have provided an eastern bypass to US 101 along the Peninsula (US 101 itself being originally a bypass to El Camino Real along the Peninsula). The route would have ended at SR 480 (the Embarcadero Freeway) practically underneath the Bay Bridge, and it would also have connected to the approaches of the unconstructed San Francisco Bay Southern Crossing. Along with SR 61, a similar project on the eastern shore of the Bay, this portion of SR 87 was abandoned due to local opposition to the project that would have destroyed a nearly pristine wildlife habitat. In 1980, the route was truncated to end at SR 237.

A resolution of the state legislature in 2007 named a section of this highway (between I-280 and Julian Street/Santa Clara Street) the Lewis E. Platt Memorial Highway (honoring the late chairman, president and chief executive officer of Hewlett-Packard who successful campaigned for local ballots to fund transportation improvements), and required that signage be paid by private donations.

Future
The high-occupancy vehicle (HOV) lanes on SR 87 are proposed to be converted into high-occupancy toll lanes. The date of conversion isn't certain, but Plan Bay Area plans for the project to be completed by 2018 and the California Department of Transportation (Caltrans) plans it by 2020. Caltrans' post-25 year concept also proposes an additional express lane in each direction.

Exit list

See also

References

External links

Caltrans: Route 87 road conditions
Eric Buchanan's Highway Photo Page: 87 Guadalupe Parkway (project history and historical images)
California Highways – State Route 87
California @ AARoads – California 87

087
087
State Route 087
State Route 087